The Canton of Villers-Bocage may refer to the following cantons:

 Canton of Villers-Bocage, Calvados
 Canton of Villers-Bocage, Somme